Bishop Cosimo Dossena, B. (1547 – 12 March 1620) was a Catholic prelate who served as Bishop of Tortona from 1612 to 1620.

Biography
Cosimo Dossena was born in Pavia in 1547 and ordained a priest in the Clerics Regular of Saint Paul.
On 27 February 1612, he was appointed during the papacy of Pope Paul V as Bishop of Tortona.
On 4 March 1612, he was consecrated bishop by Giovanni Garzia Mellini, Cardinal-Priest of Santi Quattro Coronati, with Giovanni Ambrogio Caccia, Bishop Emeritus of Castro del Lazio, and Antonio Seneca, Bishop of Anagni, serving as co-consecrators. 
He served as Bishop of Tortona until his death on 12 March 1620.

References

External links and additional sources
 (for Chronology of Bishops) 
 (for Chronology of Bishops) 

17th-century Italian Roman Catholic bishops
Bishops appointed by Pope Paul V
Religious leaders from Pavia
1547 births
1620 deaths
Barnabite bishops